A pig dragon or zhūlóng is a type of jade artifact from the Hongshan culture of neolithic China. Pig dragons are zoomorphic forms with a pig-like head and elongated limbless body coiled around to the head and described as "suggestively fetal".  Early pig dragons are thick and stubby, and later examples have more graceful, snakelike bodies.

Pig dragons were produced by the Hongshan culture. Along with the same culture's jade eagles, they often featured as grave goods. Pig bones have been found interred alongside humans at Hongshan burial sites, suggesting that the animal had some ritual significance.

There is some speculation that the pig dragon is the first representation of the Chinese dragon.  The character for "dragon" in the earliest Chinese writing has a similar coiled form, as do later jade dragon amulets from the Shang period.

See also
 Chinese jade
 Bi (jade)
 Magatama
 Lingling-o
 Gogok
 Cong (jade)

References

External links

Discussion and Images of Pig Dragons

Archaeological artifacts of China
Chinese dragons
Jade